"Left Hand Free" is a song by English indie rock band alt-J. It was released as the second single from the band's second studio album This Is All Yours on 7 July 2014.

Background and composition
With its Southern rock influences, "Left Hand Free" is atypical for an alt-J song, with the band themselves describing it as "the least Alt-J song ever." The song, written by band members Joe Newman, Thom Green and Gus Unger-Hamilton "in about 20 minutes", was built around a riff that Newman would play during rehearsals and features an organ solo from Unger-Hamilton, while Green's performance on the song was deliberately performed "as clichéd as possible," with "none of [his] personality in it." Contrary to reports that the band wrote the song at the behest of their record company, Unger-Hamilton elaborated that the song was rather "the product of having fun one afternoon in the writers’ studio and enjoying [themselves]", which eventually ended up being the track that the band's American label responded most favorably to.

Release
"Left Hand Free" was released digitally as the second single from This Is All Yours on 7 July 2014. In the United States, it entered modern rock radio on 15 July 2014 and subsequently peaked at number two on the Billboard Alternative Songs chart. The song also debuted and peaked at number 99 on the Billboard Hot 100, becoming their first entry on the chart and their most successful single in the country to date. On 27 October 2014, a remix by Lido was released as a single.

Music video
The music video for "Left Hand Free" was directed by Ryan Staake and released on 7 August 2014. It depicts a group of American teenagers doing various activities of leisure, including drinking beer, setting off fireworks, driving, and swimming in the Guadalupe River. Reviewer Tim Brayton commented "Since we're never going to see a beer ad directed by David Gordon Green, this is the next best thing. The hook is unbelievably straightforward: ‘in the summer, sexy young people like to have fun with their sexy young friends! Pick-up trucks and getting wet are often involved!’... Some of the shots are fun and relaxed; a surprising number feel worn out, like you will after you've gotten too much sun."

A second official video was also released, which features a group of young adults at a pool party. The party is guarded by bouncers armed with various guns. At the end of the video peoples faces begin to panic and a guard is shot. A helicopter hovers towards the ground and a shootout between the bouncers and the helicopter begins, causing a panic.

Media usage
The song is played in the episode "Derailed" from the fourth season of Suits.

The song appears in the 2016 Marvel Studios film Captain America: Civil War, during the first appearance of Peter Parker / Spider-Man. It is also played during the final credits of the movie.

The song is used as the theme tune for the BBC television series The Interceptor.

It is also used in the Dr Pepper commercial ‘Barbershop’.

The song is used close to the beginning of the first episode in both seasons of the Netflix series Outer Banks.

Charts

Weekly charts

Year-end charts

Certifications

Release history

References

2014 singles
2014 songs
Alt-J songs
Infectious Records singles
Songs written by Thom Sonny Green